Aglaothorax diminutiva, the diminutive shieldback, is a species of shield-backed katydid in the family Tettigoniidae. It is found in North America.

Subspecies
These four subspecies belong to the species Aglaothorax diminutiva:
 Aglaothorax diminutiva constrictans (Rentz & Weissman, 1981)
 Aglaothorax diminutiva dactyla (Rentz & Weissman, 1981)
 Aglaothorax diminutiva diminutiva (Rentz & Birchim, 1968)
 Aglaothorax diminutiva malibu (Rentz & Weissman, 1981)

References

Tettigoniinae
Articles created by Qbugbot
Insects described in 1968